Nyíregyháza is a district in western part of Szabolcs-Szatmár-Bereg County. Nyíregyháza is also the name of the town where the district seat is found. The district is located in the Northern Great Plain Statistical Region. This district is a part of Nyírség geographical region.

Geography 
Nyíregyháza District borders with Sárospatak District (Borsod-Abaúj-Zemplén County), Ibrány District and Kemecse District to the north, Baktalórántháza District and Nagykálló District to the east, Hajdúhadház District (Hajdú-Bihar County) to the south, Hajdúböszörmény District (Hajdú-Bihar County) and Tiszavasvári District to the west. The number of the inhabited places in Nyíregyháza District is 15.

Municipalities 
The district has 1 urban county, 3 towns and 11 villages.
(ordered by population, as of 1 January 2013)

The bolded municipalities are cities.

Demographics

In 2011, it had a population of 168,118 and the population density was 208/km2.

Ethnicity
Besides the Hungarian majority, the main minorities are the Roma (approx. 4,000), German (1,000), Ukrainian (500), Romanian and Russian (400), Slovak (250), Rusyn and Chinese (150) and Polish (100).

Total population (2011 census): 168,118
Ethnic groups (2011 census): Identified themselves: 154,055 persons:
Hungarians: 145,836 (94.66%)
Gypsies: 4,041 (2.62%)
Others and indefinable: 4,178 (2.71%)
Approx. 14,000 persons in Nyíregyháza District did not declare their ethnic group at the 2011 census.

Religion
Religious adherence in the county according to 2011 census:

Catholic – 61,853 (Roman Catholic – 40,165; Greek Catholic – 21,678);
Reformed – 27,914;
Evangelical – 10,039;
other religions – 3,076;
Non-religious – 19,125; 
Atheism – 1,450;
Undeclared – 44,661.

Gallery

See also
List of cities and towns of Hungary

References

External links
 Postal codes of the Nyíregyháza District

Districts in Szabolcs-Szatmár-Bereg County